Alataş is a village in Anamur district of Mersin Province, Turkey.  Situated to the north of Ören at  it is almost merged to Anamur.   The population of Alataş is 480  as of 2011. Banana is the main crop of the village.

References

Villages in Anamur District